Enos Bradsher Slaughter (April 27, 1916 – August 12, 2002), nicknamed "Country", was an American Major League Baseball (MLB) right fielder. He played for 19 seasons on four major league teams from 1938 to 1942 and 1946 to 1959. He is noted primarily for his playing for the St. Louis Cardinals and famously scored the winning run in Game 7 of the 1946 World Series for the Cardinals. A ten-time All-Star, he has been elected to both the National Baseball Hall of Fame and St. Louis Cardinals Hall of Fame.

Early life
Slaughter was born in Roxboro, North Carolina, where he earned the nickname "Country". In 1935, scout Billy Southworth signed him for the St. Louis Cardinals.

Career

Minor leagues
The Martinsville Manufacturers were Slaughter's first professional team, in 1935. When Slaughter was a minor leaguer in Columbus, Georgia, he went running towards the dugout from his position in the outfield, slowed down near the infield, and began walking the rest of the way. Manager Eddie Dyer told him, "Son, if you're tired, we'll try to get you some help." During the remainder of his major-league career, Slaughter ran everywhere he went on a baseball field. In 1937, he had 245 hits and 147 runs scored for Columbus.

Major leagues

Slaughter batted left-handed and threw right-handed. He was renowned for his smooth swing that made him a reliable "contact" hitter. Slaughter had 2,383 hits in his major league career, including 169 home runs, and 1,304 RBI in 2,380 games.  Slaughter played 19 seasons with the Cardinals, Yankees, Kansas City Athletics, and Milwaukee Braves. During that period, he was a ten-time All-Star and played in five World Series.  His 1,820 games played ranks fifth in Cardinals' history behind Yadier Molina, Ozzie Smith, Lou Brock, and Stan Musial. He presently ranks third in RBI with 1,148; sixth in ABs with 6,775; and seventh in doubles with 366.

After debuting with the Cardinals in 1938, Slaughter became an everyday outfielder for them in 1939.

Slaughter served for three years in the Army Air Corps during World War II. He was a sergeant who taught physical education. Slaughter helped set up baseball teams in Tinian and Saipan, and their games inspired the troops while drawing upwards of 20,000 spectators. Immediately upon return from his military service in 1946, Slaughter led the National League with 130 RBI and led the Cardinals to a World Series win over the Boston Red Sox. In the decisive seventh game of that series, Slaughter, running with the pitch, made a famous "Mad Dash" for home from first base on Harry Walker's hit in the eighth inning, scoring the winning run after a delayed relay throw by the Red Sox' Johnny Pesky. The hit was ruled a double, though most observers felt it should have been ruled a single, as only the throw home allowed Walker to advance to second base. This play was named No. 10 on the Sporting News list of Baseball's 25 Greatest Moments in 1999.

Slaughter was known for his hustle, especially for running hard to first base on walks, a habit later imitated by Pete Rose and David Eckstein.
 
Slaughter was reported at the time as being one of the leaders in racial taunting against the first black major league player, Jackie Robinson, and was accused of conspiring with teammate Terry Moore in an attempt to get the Cardinals to refuse to play Brooklyn with Robinson on the field. Sportswriter Bob Broeg, who covered the team at that time, refutes this claim and says that NL president Ford Frick considered the Cardinals fairer towards Robinson than any of the other teams. Slaughter later injured Robinson during a game by inflicting a seven-inch gash from his shoe spikes on Robinson's leg. Slaughter denied that he had any animosity towards Robinson, claiming that such allegations had been made against him because he was "a Southern boy", and that the injury suffered by Robinson had been typical of Slaughter's rough playing style. None of the contemporary accounts of the spiking suggested that the incident was intentional, although the August 21, 1947 St. Louis Star and Times quoted Dodgers' second-baseman Eddie Stanky as saying, "Slaughter deliberately spiked Robinson.  I always had the highest regard for Slaughter. He is one of the keenest competitors I know, and I admire him for it. But that was the first time he spiked someone deliberately. I've lost all my respect for him."

With the Yankees, Slaughter did not play as much, but he excelled as a pinch hitter for the ballclub. He batted fifth and played in left field in Game 5 of the 1956 World Series in which teammate Don Larsen pitched the only perfect game in World Series history, a 2–0 Yankees win. At age 40, he was the oldest player for either team in the game.

Post-MLB career
Slaughter retired from major league baseball in 1959. He was a player-manager for the Houston Buffs of the Texas League in 1960 and for Raleigh Capitals of the Carolina League in 1961. Slaughter coached baseball for Duke University from 1971 to 1977. He provided aid to causes such as the Duke Children's Classic, the Person County Museum of History, and Piedmont Community College.

Personal life
Slaughter had five wives, each of whom he divorced. He had four daughters: Gaye, Patricia, Rhonda, and Sharon. Henry Slaughter, his cousin, was a well-known southern gospel musician. Fellow Hall of Famer Monte Irvin was good friends with Slaughter, later voting for the player when he was finally elected to the Hall of Fame. Slaughter also mentored Lou Brock when he joined the Cardinals.

Death
Slaughter died at age 86 on August 12, 2002. He had battled non-Hodgkin lymphoma, and two weeks before his death, he had undergone colon surgery to fix torn stomach ulcers. He was buried at Allensville United Methodist Church in Person County, North Carolina.

Personal honors

His jersey number 9 was retired by the Cardinals on September 6, 1996.

The Cardinals dedicated a statue depicting his famous Mad Dash in 1999. Slaughter was a fixture at statue dedications at Busch Stadium II for other Cardinal Hall of Famers during the last years of his life.

In 2013, the Bob Feller Act of Valor Award honored Slaughter as one of 37 Baseball Hall of Fame members for his service in the United States Army Air Force during World War II.

In January, 2014, the Cardinals announced Slaughter among 22 former players and personnel to be inducted into the St. Louis Cardinals Hall of Fame Museum for the inaugural class of 2014.

See also

 List of Major League Baseball career hits leaders
 List of Major League Baseball career doubles leaders
 List of Major League Baseball career triples leaders
 List of Major League Baseball career runs scored leaders
 List of Major League Baseball career runs batted in leaders
 List of Major League Baseball annual runs batted in leaders
 List of Major League Baseball annual doubles leaders
 List of Major League Baseball annual triples leaders

References

External links

Enos Slaughter Oral History Interview (1 of 3) - National Baseball Hall of Fame Digital Collection 
Enos Slaughter Oral History Interview (2 of 3) - National Baseball Hall of Fame Digital Collection 
Enos Slaughter Oral History Interview (3 of 3) - National Baseball Hall of Fame Digital Collection 

1916 births
2002 deaths
Baseball players from North Carolina
Columbus Red Birds players
Deaths from cancer in North Carolina
Deaths from non-Hodgkin lymphoma
Duke Blue Devils baseball coaches
Houston Buffaloes managers
Houston Buffs players
Kansas City Athletics players
Major League Baseball players with retired numbers
Major League Baseball right fielders
Martinsville Manufacturers players
Military personnel from North Carolina
Milwaukee Braves players
National Baseball Hall of Fame inductees
National League All-Stars
National League RBI champions
New York Yankees players
People from Roxboro, North Carolina
Raleigh Capitals players
St. Louis Cardinals players
United States Army Air Forces personnel of World War II
United States Army Air Forces soldiers